Hollioake is a surname. Notable people with the surname include:

Adam Hollioake (born 1971), Australian-born English cricketer
Ben Hollioake (1977–2002), Australian-born English cricketer, brother of Adam

See also
Holyoake